Jalapyphantes is a genus of dwarf spiders that was first described by Carl Eduard Adolph Gerstaecker & L. I. Davis in 1946.

Species
The genus includes the following species, found in Ecuador and Mexico:
Jalapyphantes cuernavaca Gertsch & Davis, 1946 (type) – Mexico
Jalapyphantes minoratus Gertsch & Davis, 1946 – Mexico
Jalapyphantes obscurus Millidge, 1991 – Ecuador
Jalapyphantes puebla Gertsch & Davis, 1946 – Mexico
Jalapyphantes tricolor Silva-Moreira & Hormiga, 2021 – Mexico

See also
 List of Linyphiidae species (I–P)

References

Araneomorphae genera
Linyphiidae
Spiders of Central America
Spiders of Mexico